Air Marshal Sir John Hulme "Win" Harris,  (3 June 1938 – 2 July 2019) was a British Royal Air Force officer and specialist in maritime patrol specialist. He served as Commandant-General of the RAF Regiment and Director-General of Security (RAF) from 1987 to 1989, and Air Officer Commanding No. 18 Group RAF from 1992 to 1996.

References

Royal Air Force air marshals
1938 births
2019 deaths
Royal Air Force Regiment officers
British aviators
Knights Commander of the Order of the Bath
Commanders of the Order of the British Empire